Convento de Santa Cruz do Buçaco is a former Carmelite monastery in the Mata Nacional do Buçaco (Buçaco Forest) protected forest of the Serra do Buçaco, Portugal.

It was constructed in 1628. It closed in 1834 following the suppression of male religious orders and dissolution of the monasteries in Portugal at the end of the Portuguese Civil War.

Most of the buildings were demolished and the stones were reused in the Palace Hotel of Buçaco. However the chapel of the convent, with Baroque altarpieces, remains beside the hotel.

References

Carmelite monasteries in Portugal
National monuments in Aveiro District